Scatman's World is the debut major-label studio album (and second overall) by American musician Scatman John, recorded after the worldwide success of his debut single "Scatman (Ski-Ba-Bop-Ba-Dop-Bop)". It is something of a concept album dealing with an imaginary Utopian society named "Scatland". He speaks about this at length in the liner notes, as well in several tracks on the album, most notably the track "Song of Scatland".

Scatman's World was very popular internationally, particularly in Japan, where it reached No. 2 and stayed on the charts for 40 weeks, selling more than 1,560,000 copies overall, ranking among the top twenty best-selling albums of all time in that country recorded by non-Japanese artists.  In the late 2010s and early 2020s, the title track "Scatman's World" saw a resurgence in popularity due to becoming an Internet meme.

Track listing

Charts

Weekly charts

Year-end charts

Certifications

See also
 List of best-selling albums in Japan

References

1995 albums
RCA Records albums
Scatman John albums